Megachile willughbiella, Willughby's leaf-cutter bee is a species of bee in the family Megachilidae. It was described by the English entomologist William Kirby in 1802; he named it in honour of the ornithologist Francis Willughby.

Description

Megachile willughbiella is a leafcutter bee found in gardens and brownfield areas especially in cities. The nest is built in soil or in wood; the cells are made of leaves. The species has kleptoparasites from the leafcutting cuckoo bee genus Coelioxys, such as C. quadridentata, C. rufescens and C. elongata. Pollen is collected from a wide variety of flowers including Asteraceae, Fabaceae and Onagraceae, with a preference for Campanulaceae (bellflowers).

Distribution

The species is widely spread across western Europe between Finland, Lithuania and Spain, including Britain and Ireland. In Britain it is one of the most commonly recorded leafcutter species; it is absent from the north Midlands and from mid- and north Wales, but occurs from Cornwall all the way to Inverness, becoming scarcer with latitude.

References

willughbiella
Insects described in 1802